Las delicias del poder ("The Delights of Power") is a 1999 Mexican political satire comedy film directed by Iván Lipkies starring María Elena Velasco as La India María with Ernesto Gómez Cruz, Irma Dorantes, and Adalberto Martínez. The film broke the box-office record in Mexico at the time of its release earning 11 million pesos and having been the second-highest grossing film of the year.

Plot
In 1952, the presidential candidate of the PUM (Partido Único de Machos) political party Carmelo Barriga visits the rural town of San Jilemón el Alto where he gives a speech promoting his candidacy and political party. During the speech and among the townspeople, a young woman gives birth to two twin girls. In a political move, Carmelo decides to adopt one of the girls whom he names Lorena and who becomes an active politician in her own political party, the PUF (Partido Único Femenino). Lorena then becomes a presidential candidate running against her rival, Santos Barboza of the PUM. When Lorena and her campaign visits San Toribio del Trueno, a firework accident causes her to abandon the candidacy. Fortunately, campaign member Gonzalo remembers about Lorena's twin and decides to search for her so that she can substitute Lorena and therefore the campaign can resume.

Cast
María Elena Velasco as María Becerra / Lorena Barriga
Ernesto Gómez Cruz	as Carmelo Barriga
Irma Dorantes as Consuelo Artigas
Farnesio de Bernal as Gonzalo
Adalberto Martínez as Remígio
Héctor Ortega as Santos Barboza
Arturo Echeverría as Germán
José Luis Moreno as Cajigas (credited as Moreno López)
Alicia Sandoval as Remedios
Fernando Mena as Ocampo
Alejandro Márquez as Assistante de Santos
Raúl Martínez as Assistante de Santos
Carlos Rotzinger as Presidente
Campaña de Carmelo
Pancho Cruz as Porrista
Rosa Isela González as Mujer embarazada
Paola Flores as Mujer indígena
Esperanza Valerio as Comadrona
Ingrid Quintana as Jovencita
Goretti Lipkies as Enfermera
Miguel Ramírez as Doctor
Auditorio W.T.C
Sergio Zaldivar as Reportero
Joel Adame Salazar as Reportero
Gaby Cairo as Reportera de T.V.
Miguel Ángel Mejía as Guarura de Carmelo
Enrique Juárez as Guarura de Carmelo
Oficina Santos
Osvaldo Álvarez as Periodista 
Daniel Rojo as Periodista
Jovita Ocampo as Ciudadana
Blanca Vargas as Ciudadana
Mercado
Andrea Villa as Locataria
Tony Martínez as Marchanta
Tere Ocampo as Marchanta jarocha
Campaña Lorena
Adrián Méndez as Cohetero
Jorge Lazcano as Cohetero
Fernando Castro as Presidente municipal
Hospital
Claudia Fandiño as Enfermera
Rodrigo de Garay as Locutor de T.V.
Alfredo Visoso as Doctor en camilla
Gloria Velasco as Doctora
Pueblo sin agua
Gregorio Ruíz as Campesino
Mercado de Jamaica
Víctor Guzmán as Pancho
Tomás Nomás as Trovador
Alejandro Bautista as Teporocho
Juan Carlos Ocampo as Teporocho
Felipe Solís as Chente el policleto
Delegación
Ramón Barrera as Burócrata
Casa de Carmelo
Eduardo Pesqueira as Director de periódico
Francisco Duarte as Director de periódico
Cecilia Alcocer as Locutora de T.V.
Roberto Morlet as Guardacasa en calle
Marcial Casale as Guardacasa en caseta
Teotihuacan
Ernesto Pape as Empresario americano
Rubén Cerda as Congresista gordo
José Luis Pape as Americano con puro
Yekaterina Kiev as Edecán con camotes
Sandra Rojas as Bailarina
Pola Klagge as Mtra. de ceremonias
Víctor Jackson as Bailarín
Domingo Rivera as Mesero
Alejandro Cairo as Arqueólogo
Lázaro Patterson as Americano de color
Noticiero de televisión
Álvaro Cerviño as Locutor
Rocío Yeo as Locutora
Aeropuerto
Carlos Gastélum as Gobernador
Maru Dueñas as Marilyn
Montserrat Gómez as Amiga de Marilyn
Cap. P.A. Enrique Berra as Piloto
Escuela de policía
Alejandro Linares as Policía entrenador
Eugenio Lobo as Reportero
Rafael Rodríguez as Tirador
Cena japonesa
Gerardo Carmona as Chef japonés
Kiyohiro Watanabe as Chef japonés
Shoki Goto as Embajador
Tamy Yumibe as Esposa
Kosuke Heianna as Canciller
Roberto Wock as Guardaespaldas
Kasuko Nagao as Comensal
Sayuri Takahashi as Comensal
Lulu Delgado as Geisha
Minerva García as Geisha
Debate
Jorge Obregón as Curioso en debate
Hilario García as Jefe de seguridad
Oscar Vives as Turrubiates
Evaristo Osorio as Opportunista
Gerardo Campbell as Benavides
Adriana del Río as Moderadora
Avenida
Miguel Galván as Cochinón

References

External links

Mexican comedy films
Mexican satirical films
Mexican political satire films
1999 comedy films
1999 films
1990s Mexican films